Verkhneye Inkhelo is a rural locality (a selo) and the administrative centre of Verkhneinkhelinsky Selsoviet, Akhvakhsky District, Republic of Dagestan, Russia. The population was 397 as of 2010.

Geography 
Verkhneye Inkhelo is located 10 km north of Karata (the district's administrative centre) by road, on the Akhvakh River. Mashtada is the nearest rural locality.

References 

Rural localities in Akhvakhsky District